Hirudo is a genus of leeches of the family Hirudinidae. It was described by Carl Linnaeus in his landmark 1758 10th edition of Systema Naturae.

The two well-accepted species within the genus are:
Hirudo medicinalis Linnaeus, 1758
Hirudo nipponia Whitman, 1886
Three other species, previously synonymized with H. medicinalis, were described in 2005 and are gaining acceptance:
 Hirudo verbana
 Hirudo orientalis
 Hirudo sulukii
 Hirudo troctina
 Hirudo tianjinensis

Description
Species are typically exterior feeders. They have jaws that typically consist of about 60 teeth and do not possess papillae.

Distribution
Hirudo medicinalis: Britain and southern Norway to the southern Urals, probably as far as the Altai Mountains (the deciduous arboreal zone)
Hirudo verbana: Switzerland and Italy to Turkey and Uzbekistan (the Mediterranean and sub-boreal steppe zone)
Hirudo orientalis: Transcaucasian countries, Iran, and Central Asia (mountainous areas in the sub-boreal eremial zone)
Hirudo sulukii: Kara Lake of Adiyaman, Sülüklü Lake of Gaziantep and Segirkan wetland of Batman in Turkey
Hirudo troctina: North-western Africa and Spain (Mediterranean zone)
Hirudo nipponia: East Asia, including Far East district in Russian, Japan, Korea, China, Mongolia, Ryukyu Islands and Taiwan
Hirudo tianjinensis: China 

Hirudo verbana is further divided into nonoverlapping eastern and western phylogroups.

Medical use
While H. medicinalis has long been used in hirudotherapy, and is approved by the US FDA as a prescription medical device, a 2007 study employing genetic analysis found that the species being marketed as  H. medicinalis, possibly for decades, was the recently distinguished H. verbana.

Conservation status 

A 2010 study of data gathered four species proposed an IUCN status of near threatened for H. medicinalis, H. verbana, and H. orientalis, and a status of data deficient for H. troctina.

References

Leeches
Annelid genera